The fourth USS Falcon (AMS-190/MSC-190) was a  in the United States Navy.

Construction
Falcon was laid down 7 May 1953, as AMS-190; launched 21 September 1953, by Quincy Adams Yacht Yard, Inc., Quincy, Massachusetts; sponsored by Mrs. A. D. MacDonnell; and commissioned 24 November 1954. She was reclassified MSC-190 on 7 February 1955.

East Coast operations
Between 7 January 1955 and 16 January 1957, Falcon was based at Charleston, South Carolina, for minesweeping exercises, amphibious operations, and mine warfare development activities along the east coast and in the Caribbean. Little Creek, the amphibious base in the Norfolk, Virginia, naval complex, was her home port for similar operations until 12 February 1959, when she sailed for Rodman, Canal Zone. During 1960, she sailed out of Rodman for operations on both sides of the Panama Canal, and visits to Central American islands and ports.

Transfer to Indonesia
In 1971, Falcon was transferred to Indonesia and renamed Pulau Aru (M-722. She was struck from the US Naval Register on 1 May 1976, and disposed for scrap through the Defense Reutilization and Marketing Service 1 September 1976.

Notes 

Citations

Bibliography 

Online resources

External links
 Falcon- AMS-190
 USS Falcon, Oriole Decommissioned
 

 

Adjutant-class minesweepers
Bluebird-class minesweepers
Cold War mine warfare vessels of the United States
Ships built in Quincy, Massachusetts
1953 ships
Ships transferred from the United States Navy to the Indonesian Navy
Pulau Aru